The five-qubit error correcting code is the smallest quantum error correcting code that can protect a logical qubit from any arbitrary single qubit error. In this code, 5 physical qubits are used to encode the logical qubit. Once the logical qubit is encoded, errors on the physical qubits can be detected via stabilizer measurements. A lookup table that maps the results of the stabilizer measurements to the types and locations of the errors gives the control system of the quantum computer enough information to correct errors.

Measurements 

Stabilizer measurements are parity measurements that measure the stabilizers of physical qubits.
Since there are four stabilizers, 4 ancillas will be used to measure them. The first 4 qubits in the image above are the ancillas. The resulting bits from the ancillas is the syndrome; which encodes the type of error that occurred and its location.

Error correction 
It is possible to compute all the single qubit errors that can occur and how to correct them. This is done by calculating what errors commute with the stabilizers. For example, if there is an  error on the first qubit and no errors on the others, it commutes with the first stabilizer . This means that if an X error occurs on the first qubit, the first ancilla qubit will be 0. The second ancilla qubit: , the third:  and the fourth . Similar calculations are realized for all other possible errors to fill out the table. 

To correct an error, the same operation is performed on the physical qubit based on its syndrome.

Encoding 
The first step in executing error corrected quantum computation is to encode the computer's initial state by transforming the physical qubits into logical codewords. Since the logical codewords for the five qubit code are 

,

Stabilizer measurements followed by a  measurement can be used to encode 5 physical qubits into a logical qubit. To prepare , perform stabilizer measurements and apply error correction. After error correction, the logical state is guaranteed to be a logical codeword. If it's , applying  will transform it into .

References 

Quantum computing